The 2002 Copa Colsanitas was a women's tennis tournament played on outdoor clay courts at the Club Campestre El Rancho in Bogotá, Colombia that was part of Tier III of the 2002 WTA Tour. It was the fifth edition of the tournament and ran from 19 February through 25 February 2002. Unseeded wild-card Fabiola Zuluaga won the singles title and earned $27,000.

Finals

Singles

 Fabiola Zuluaga defeated  Katarina Srebotnik 6–1, 6–4
 It was Zuluaga's 1st singles title of the year and the 4th of her career.

Doubles

 Virginia Ruano Pascual /  Paola Suárez defeated  Tina Križan /  Katarina Srebotnik 6–2, 6–1

References

External links
 Official website 
 Official website 
 ITF tournament edition details
 Tournament draws

Copa Colsanitas
Copa Colsanitas
2002 in Colombian tennis